Cammin may refer to:

Cammin, Rostock, a municipality in the district of Rostock, Mecklenburg-Vorpommern, Germany
Cammin (Burg Stargard), a village in the town of Burg Stargard, Mecklenburg-Vorpommern, Germany
the German name for Kamień Pomorski, West Pomeranian Voivodeship, Poland
the former Bishopric of Cammin